Panamarathupatty is a former state assembly constituency in Salem district in Tamil Nadu, India. Elections and winners in the constituency are listed below.

Members of Legislative Assembly

Election results

2006

2001

1996

1991

1989

1984

1980

1977

1971

1967

References

External links
 

Former assembly constituencies of Tamil Nadu
Salem district